The Interests Section of the Islamic Republic of Iran in the United States is a part of the Pakistani Embassy in Washington, D.C., and is the de facto consular representation of the Islamic Republic of Iran in the United States.

Iranian students seized the U.S. Embassy in Tehran during the 1979 Iranian Revolution, leading to the breaking of diplomatic relations between Iran and the United States. As part of the Algiers Accords of 1981, the two countries agreed to establish "interests sections" to look after their interests in the other country. Each country picked a third country, which had friendly relations with both sides, to be its protecting power in the other capital.

The Iranian embassy was seized by the U.S. State Department in retaliation for Iran's seizure of the U.S. Embassy in Tehran. As a result, the Iranian Interests Section operated out of a small office on Wisconsin Avenue associated with the Pakistani Embassy between 1981 and 2015. It has since relocated to a larger office space on 23rd Street NW, near D.C.'s Washington Circle.

Algeria originally served as Iran's protecting power in the U.S. However, when Iranian leaders expressed support for the Islamic Salvation Front in January 1992, Algeria refused to continue serving as Iran's protecting power. In March 1992, Pakistan agreed to undertake a mandate as Iran's protecting power in the U.S.

The Interests Section provides all essential consular services to Iranian citizens and issued visas to foreigners. Since the severing of diplomatic ties by Canada in 2012, the Section also handles the consular affairs of Iranian citizens residing in Canada.

Directors of the Interests Section, Stationed at Washington
This is an incomplete list. As agreed in the Algiers Accords of 1981, the Director is the sole Iranian diplomat at the Section. The rest of the employees are the clerical staff.

 Mr. Faramarz Fathnezhad (1996)
 Mr. Fariborz Jahansoozan (2000)
 Mr. Ali Jazini Dorcheh (2005)
 Mr. Mostafa Rahmani (2010)
 Mr. Mehdi Atefat (2015)

Interests Section of the U.S. in Iran

The U.S. Interests Section in Tehran has been operating under the Swiss Embassy since 1980. Services for American citizens are limited. The section is not authorized to perform any U.S. visa/green card/immigration-related services. Contrary to usual practice, the old U.S. embassy complex was not handed over to the Swiss. Instead, part of the embassy has been turned into an anti-American museum, while the rest has become student organizations' offices.

See also
 Former Embassy of Iran in Washington, D.C.
 Iran–United States relations
 Foreign relations of Iran
 List of ambassadors of Iran to the United States
 Cuban Interests Section, now an embassy

References

External links
Interests Section of the Islamic Republic of Iran - Washington D.C. 

Iran–United States relations
Iran–Pakistan relations
Pakistan–United States relations
De facto embassies
Diplomatic missions in Washington, D.C.
Diplomatic missions of Iran